Starchildren was a side project of The Smashing Pumpkins frontman Billy Corgan. From 1990 to 1994 the band played a few scattered live shows, each usually featuring a different lineup of band members with only Corgan having constant involvement. The band officially released two songs, "Delusions of Candor", an original composition by Corgan, and a cover of "Isolation" by Joy Division.

History
First appearing in 1990 (then billed as Star Children), Corgan gave the motto of the band as "Be repetitive for nuisance's sake." Little is known about the early incarnation of the band, other than they played at least two shows at the Cabaret Metro with varying members including Corgan, Jimmy Chamberlin, Neil Jendon, Cliff Fox, and Kerry Brown (the latter three members of the band Catherine).

In 1994, the band emerged with a more visible presence playing a June 18 show that received coverage as an incognito Smashing Pumpkins show, despite it being a traditional Starchildren performance. The performance that night featured several songs that would later make their way onto Smashing Pumpkins' releases. Songs performed included The Cure cover "A Night Like This" and the James Iha penned "The Boy" which were later released in The Aeroplane Flies High box set, as well as an early version of "Here Is No Why" from Mellon Collie and the Infinite Sadness.

Although Starchildren was already closely associated with the band Catherine due to the groups' frequently overlapping members, this association was taken to another level by the 1994 release of the split 7-inch vinyl record "Songs about Girls"/"Delusions of Candor". One side of the record featured the Catherine song "Songs about Girls" while the reverse featured the Starchildren tune "Delusions of Candor". Delusions of Candor featured Billy Corgan's then best friend, and Smashing Pumpkins first manager and guitar technician Bob English on bass, but he only got a "thanks to" credit on the single and received no compensation of any kind. This is the only original Starchildren composition released to date.

In 1995, the band's cover of Joy Division's "Isolation" appeared on the tribute album A Means to an End: The Music of Joy Division.

In January 2010, Corgan announced plans to start a new record label, which may release new material from Starchildren. As of 2020, no new material has materialized.

Discography
 "Delusions of Candor" (1994)
 "Isolation" on A Means to an End: The Music of Joy Division (1995)

Footnotes

TVT Records artists
Supergroups (music)
Musical groups established in 1990
Musical groups disestablished in 1994
Alternative rock groups from Illinois
Billy Corgan